Yeung Sze (born 3 July 1946), better known as Bolo Yeung, is a Hong Kong former competitive bodybuilder, martial artist  and a martial arts film actor. He is globally known for his performances as Bolo in Enter the Dragon (starring Bruce Lee), as serial killer in Tiger Claws (starring Cynthia Rothrock) and the dominant Chong Li in Bloodsport (starring Jean-Claude Van Damme) as well as other numerous appearances and long career in Hong Kong martial arts films.

Biography
Yeung began his martial arts training at the age of 10 in Canton, where he trained under several kung fu masters. Growing up, he took an interest in bodybuilding, and later became Mr. Hong Kong bodybuilding champion. He held the title for ten years. Because of his muscular physique, he was chosen for several bad guy roles in films produced by Shaw Brothers Studios, such as The Heroic Ones, The Deadly Duo, Angry Guest and others. He left Shaw Brothers in 1971.

Yeung met Bruce Lee while the two were filming a Winston cigarettes commercial. A friendship emerged and Lee invited him to star in Enter the Dragon, after which he became known as "Bolo", the name of the character he portrayed. The two became close friends during the filming of Enter the Dragon, in which Lee and Yeung worked very closely on technique training. Yeung once stated in an interview, many years after Lee's death, "There will never be another Bruce Lee; I am privileged to have had the honour of calling him my friend."

During the 1970s and 1980s, Yeung starred in numerous martial arts films, but his breakout film was Bloodsport. Shot on a 1.5 million USD budget, it became a box office hit in the spring of 1988. Jean-Claude Van Damme had the leading role as Frank Dux, while Yeung played the role of Chong Li. A strong friendship formed between the two actors on the set of Bloodsport, and Van Damme invited Yeung to appear in his subsequent film Double Impact.

Canadian action film actor, director and producer Jalal Merhi met Yeung in Hong Kong while shooting his first film Fearless Tiger, then again on the set of Double Impact. Merhi was impressed with Yeung's personality and ability, and decided to create a part specifically for him. Later Merhi worked with Yeung on more films such as Tiger Claws, TC 2000 and Tiger Claws 2.

In 2007, Yeung made a rare appearance in Blizhniy Boy: The Ultimate Fighter. Merhi directed the first 60 minutes of the film that was shot in Toronto. Due to other commitments, he could not complete the remaining part of the film in Russia. Producer Erken Ialgashev directed the remainder of the film.

Filmography

References

Further reading 
 Hong Kong Action Cinema by Bey Logan (21 Sep 1995)
 Martial Arts Illustrated (UK), 1990 September, Vol 3, Num 4
Inside Kung Fu, 1991 September, Vol 18, Num 9
 Inside Kung Fu, 1992 June, Vol 19, Num 6
 Martial Arts Illustrated (UK), 1992 November, Vol 5, Num 6
 Inside Karate, 1993 January, Vol 14, Num 1
 Masters of Kung Fu, 1993 December, Vol 1, Num 7
 Inside Karate, 1994 March, Vol 15, Num 3

External links

Bolo Yeung Biography (Wayback Machine copy)

1946 births
Living people
Chinese bodybuilders
Hong Kong bodybuilders
Chinese wushu practitioners
Chinese male weightlifters
Hong Kong male film actors
Male actors from Guangzhou
Sportspeople from Guangzhou
Hong Kong male weightlifters
Male actors from Guangdong
Hong Kong people of Hakka descent
British people of Chinese descent
People from Meixian District
Chinese male film actors